The Young Democrats of North Carolina (YDNC) are the official youth arm of the North Carolina Democratic Party (NCDP). As an auxiliary organization of the NCDP, the President and National Committee-members of the YDNC serve as part of the State Executive Committee of the NCDP.

Formed in 1928, the Young Democrats of North Carolina is the oldest Young Democrats chapter in America. It founded the Young Democrats of America.

It actively engages North Carolina Democrats from the ages of 18 to 36 who have an active interest in governmental affairs, who are seeking a mechanism for satisfying political expression, and who want to make the members of the Democratic Party aware that young people intend to take an active role in party affairs.

Campaign role
The Young Democrats of North Carolina (YDNC) is responsible for party organizational activity among North Carolina Democrats ages 18–36. In elections, it coordinates with state and local candidates, raises funds, and coordinates campaign strategy to bolster youth turnout.

YDNC currently is composed of 18 county chapters at the time of the 2022 Statewide Convention, held in Winston-Salem, North Carolina. 

In spring 2018, YDNC launched the Cardinal Candidates program aimed at increasing the turnout of young voters in districts where Young Democrats are running for office. The program currently targets 26 Congressional and state legislative districts across the state.

State Convention 
YDNC holds its State Convention at a different location every year. At Convention, the organization holds trainings, networking receptions, and elections for statewide officers. In recent years, the YDNC has co-hosted the Convention with the College Democrats of North Carolina and the North Carolina Association of Teen Democrats.

In 2018, YDNC held its 90th Anniversary State Convention on the campus of the University of North Carolina at Charlotte. Senator Vin Gopal and Mayor Vi Lyles served as speakers at the Luncheon.

The 2017 State Convention, held at the University of North Carolina at Greensboro, featured Mayor Pete Buttigieg as the keynote speaker.

In 2016, the State Convention was held in Raleigh, North Carolina, and included then-Attorney General Roy Cooper as the keynote speaker.

In 2014, YDNC held the Convention in Greenville, North Carolina, that featured U.S. Senator Kay Hagan and NC Attorney General Roy Cooper.

In 2022, YDNC held the Convention in Winston-Salem, North Carolina, that featured NC Supreme Court Associate Justice Sam Ervin as the Keynote Speaker.

On March 29, 2008, YDNC held its 80th Anniversary Statewide Convention in which a record 600+ people attended. Guest speakers included Chelsea Clinton, James Carville and John Edwards. Although this was the first time John Edwards spoke publicly after he resigned his campaign, he did not endorse either Hillary Clinton or Barack Obama for the Democratic presidential nomination.

Leadership and Board of Trustees
YDNC elects statewide officers at the yearly YDNC convention. Additionally, it appoints leaders on a yearly basis to serve on a board of trustees. Governor Jim Hunt, a former Young Democrats President, serves as the Honorary Chair of the YDNC Board of Trustees. This board serves in an advisory role to YDNC, and assists in fund raising efforts.

2022–23 Executive Officers:
 President: Nathaniel Jacobs
 Executive Vice President: Kristen Robinson
 Vice-President for Communications: Samuel Johnson
 Vice-President for Membership: Natalee Nieves
 Vice-President for Development: Michael Careccia
 Young Democrats of America National Committee Representative (Seat 1): Anderson Clayton
 Young Democrats of America National Committee Representative (Seat 2): Katherine Jeanes
 Secretary: Zach Finley
 Treasurer: Melissa Cordell

Notable alumni

Former presidents
 Former US Senator and Governor Terry Sanford
 Former Governor Jim Hunt
 Secretary of State Elaine Marshall
 Democratic Strategist Morgan Jackson
 Former NC Insurance Commissioner Wayne Goodwin
 Representative Zack Hawkins
 Democratic Strategist Courtney Crowder
 Democratic Strategist Conen Morgan
 Morganton Mayor Ronnie Thompson

Notable former members
 US Senate Candidate Cal Cunningham
 Governor Roy Cooper

Legislative work
YDNC has worked to pass House Bill 91, In-Person Registration and Voting. The new law allows voters to register up to three days before Election Day, down from 25 days under the old law. The measure also provides several safeguards to ensure the integrity of voter registration and toughens criminal penalties for those who commit fraud.

Mascot
The official mascot of the YDNC is the "fearless" honey badger, since "Young Democrats are also devoid of fear."

See also

Young Republicans
North Carolina Democratic Party

References

Democratic Party (United States) organizations
Youth-led organizations
Young Democrats of America
North Carolina Democratic Party
1928 establishments in North Carolina